Stafford is an English surname originating from Staffordshire which may derive from  Anglo-Saxon meaning 'landing stage by the ford'. The Staffords may also refer to the people of Staffordshire. see also:
de Stafford,
de Staffort

People
People with this surname include:

Stafford (baseball), 19th century baseball player(s) with an unknown given name
Abi Stafford, American ballet dancer and sister of Jonathan
Alexander Stafford, British politician
Anne Stafford, Countess of Huntingdon (1483–1544), mistress of Henry VIII who was prosecuted for adultery with his friend, William Compton
Barbara Stafford
Barbara Stafford (born 1953), American legislator
Barbara Maria Stafford (born 1941), American art historian and writer
Drew Stafford (born 1985), American professional ice hockey player
Edmund Stafford (disambiguation)
 Edmund Stafford (1344–1419) Bishop of Exeter
 Edmund Stafford, 1st Baron Stafford (1272–1308), British nobleman who was summoned to parliament by King Edward I
 Edmund Stafford, 5th Earl of Stafford (1377–1398), British nobleman
 Edward Stafford (disambiguation)
Edward Stafford (politician) (1819–1901), third Premier of New Zealand
Edward Stafford, 3rd Duke of Buckingham (1478–1521), brother of Henry VIII's mistress Anne Stafford, executed for treason
Edward Stafford, 2nd Earl of Wiltshire (1470–1498), British nobleman
Edward Stafford, 3rd Baron Stafford (1535–1603), British nobleman
Edward Stafford, 4th Baron Stafford (1572–1625), British nobleman
Sir Edward Stafford (diplomat) (1552–1604), British ambassador to Paris; MP; a traitor in the pay of Spain
Sir Edward Stafford (politician) (1819–1901), Premier of New Zealand
Cdr. Edward Peary Stafford, USN (Ret.) (1918-2013), USN officer, naval aviator, and author.
Ed Stafford (Edward James Stafford FRSGS; born 1975), British explorer
Emma Stafford, British classicist
Erik Stafford, American economist
Frederick Stafford (1928–1979), Austrian-born actor
Garrett Stafford (born 1980), American professional hockey player
Godfrey Stafford (born 1920), South African-born British physicist
Greg Stafford
Greg Stafford (1948–2018), formally "Francis Gregory Stafford", American role playing game designer and shamanic practitioner
Greg Stafford (footballer) (born 1974), Australian rules football player
Jessica-Jane Stafford (née Jessica-Jane Clement; born 1985), British actress and TV presenter
Harrison Stafford (1912–2004), American football player
Harry Stafford (disambiguation)
Harry Stafford (1869–1940), British footballer
Harry Stafford (motorcyclist) (born 1993), British motorcycle racer
Henry Stafford (disambiguation)
Henry Stafford, 1st Baron Stafford (1501–1563), British nobleman
Henry Stafford, 2nd Duke of Buckingham (1454–1483), British nobleman
Sir Henry Stafford (died 1471), second son of Humphrey Stafford, 1st Duke of Buckingham and Lady Anne Neville, and third husband of Margaret Beaufort, Countess of Richmond and Derby
Hugh Stafford, 2nd Earl of Stafford (1342–1386), British nobleman
Humphrey Stafford (disambiguation)
Humphrey Stafford, 1st Duke of Buckingham (1402–1460), British nobleman and a military commander in the Hundred Years' War and the Wars of the Roses
Humphrey Stafford, Earl of Stafford (1425–1455), British nobleman
Humphrey Stafford, 1st Earl of Devon, 1st Baron Stafford of Southwick (1439?–69), British nobleman
James Stafford (born 1926), American Cardinal Major Penitentiary of the Roman Catholic Church
Jean Stafford (1915–1979), American short story writer and novelist
Jean Stafford (musician) (born 1950), Australian country music artist
Jim Stafford (born 1944), American comedian and musician
Jo Stafford (1917–2008), American traditional pop singer
John Stafford (disambiguation)
John Stafford (d.1452), Archbishop of Canterbury
John Stafford, 1st Earl of Wiltshire (1427–1473), English nobleman
Jonathan Stafford, American retired ballet dancer, New York City Ballet artistic director and brother of Abi
Lee Stafford (born 1966), celebrity hairdresser
Marilyn Stafford (1925-2023), American-born British photographer
Mary Stafford, née Mary Boleyn, sister of Anne Boleyn and mistress of Henry VIII
Mary Stafford (singer) (1895–1938), American cabaret singer
Matthew Stafford
Matthew Stafford (born 1988), American football player
Matthew Stafford (politician) (1852–1950), Irish businessman and senator
Michelle Stafford (born 1965), American actress, screenwriter and producer
Nancy Stafford (born 1954), American actress, speaker and author
Ralph Stafford, 1st Earl of Stafford (1301–1372), British nobleman
Robert Stafford (disambiguation), several people
Ronald B. Stafford (1935–2005), American politician
Susan Stafford (born 1945), American model, actress and television host
Tal Stafford (1890–1967), American college sports coach
Terry Stafford (1941–1996), American singer and songwriter
Thomas Stafford (disambiguation), several people
Victoria "Tori" Stafford (2000–2009), Canadian murder victim 
William Stafford (disambiguation), several people

Fictional characters
 Edward Stafford (The Tudors), a fictionalized version of the 3rd Duke of Buckingham, on the TV show "The Tudors"

Others
Justice Stafford (disambiguation), judges named Stafford
Baron Stafford, persons of the Stafford Barony, holding the title Baron Stafford ; also Viscount Stafford
Earl of Stafford, persons of the Stafford Earldom, holding the title Count of Stafford ; also Marquess Stafford

See also

 
 Stafford (disambiguation)
 Stafford family tree showing relationships between some of the above.

References

English-language surnames
English toponymic surnames